Pretz (プリッツ, Purittsu) is a Japanese snack made by Ezaki Glico. Like Ezaki Glico's other popular snack, Pocky, Pretz is stick-shaped and comes with a texture similar to pretzels. Unlike Pocky, Pretz is dusted with seasonings instead of enrobed in a flavoured fudge.

Pretz comes in multiple varieties and three sizes: Regular, Kid's, and Giant. Most Pretz come in the Regular size, with some flavours also being offered in Giant size. The Kid's size is a smaller pack of Pretz and is sweeter to appeal to children. Kid's packages also come with a cartoon child on the package. The Double Pretz variety offers two separate flavours on a single Pretz stick (one flavor on each half) and the Meets Wine variety is a cheese-flavored Pretz named to suggest it be paired with wine.

Flavors

Pretz also differs from Pocky in that most of the flavours are savory rather than sweet. The following is a list of existing Pretz flavors:

  Roast Pretz
  Salad Pretz (also known as Original Pretz)
  11 Types Mixed Salad Pretz
  Tomato Pretz  (also available in Giant size)
  Honey Mustard Pretz (a.k.a. American Pretz)
  Corn Pretz
  Kona Coffee Pretz
  Salt Caramel Pretz
  Pizza Pretz
  Edamame Pretz
  Black Pepper Pretz
  Honey and Pomelo Pretz
  Baked Potato Pretz
  Cheese and Potato Pretz
  Butter Pretz
  Bacon Pretz
  Maple Syrup Pretz
  Maple and Butter Pretz
  Egg Pudding Pretz
  Mozzarella Meets Wine Pretz
  Cheddar Meets Wine Pretz
  Fried Pretz
  Melon Pretz
  Spicy Chicken Pretz (a.k.a. Beer Pretz)
  Cacao Pretz
  Basil Pretz
  Purple Potato Pretz
  Asparagus Pretz
  Cheddar Pretz
  Cheese Pretz
  Scallop Butter Pretz
  Ham & Cheese Pretz
  Hard-Baked Pretz
  Pumpkin Pretz
  Dumpling Pretz
  Green Bean Pretz
  Hatchimitzu Pretz (a.k.a. Honey Pancake Pretz, Kid's size)
  Milk Cocoa Pretz (Kid's size)
  Fruits Pretz
  Blueberry Cheese Double Pretz
  Matcha Vanilla Double Pretz
  Ebi Chili Pretz (a.k.a. Shrimp Chili Sauce Pretz, also available in Giant size)
  Hokkaido Potato Pretz
  French Toast Pretz
  Grilled Curry Pretz
  Bakery Flat Style Pretz
  Takoyaki Pretz
  Mabo Tofu Pretz 
  Apple Pretz
  Salt Butter Pretz
  Tom Yum Pretz
  Sweet Corn Pretz
  Seaweed Wasabi Pretz (limited edition)
  Spicy Squid Pretz (limited edition)
  Giant Pretz Edo (limited edition sold in Tokyo, Japan)
  Giant Eel Pretz (limited edition sold in Shizuoka, Japan)
  Soba Pretz (discontinued limited edition sold in Shinshu, Japan)
  Giant Nozawana Pretz (a.k.a. Pickled Green Vegetable Pretz, limited edition sold in Shinshu, Japan)
  Giant Haccho Miso Pretz (limited edition sold in Aichi, Japan)
  Giant Mentaiko Pretz (a.k.a. Hakata Cod Ovum Pretz, limited edition sold in Kyushu, Japan)
  Hawaiian Pineapple Pretz (sold in Hawaii)
  Larb Pretz (sold in Thailand)
  Chilli Cha Cha Pretz (sold in Thailand)
  Coconut Pretz (sold in Guam and Saipan)
  Maple Pretz (sold in Canada, a.k.a. Canada Pretz)
  Abalone Pretz (sold in Hong Kong)
  Shark's Fin Pretz (sold in Hong Kong)
  Hairy Crab Pretz (sold in Shanghai)
  Peking Duck Pretz (sold in Shanghai)
  Sichuan Mala Pretz (sold in Shanghai)
  Green Tea Pretz (sold in Japan)
  Green Pea Pretz (sold in Japan)
  Ume Pretz (sold in Japan)
  Giant Salmon Pretz (sold in Japan)
  Giant Apple Pretz (sold in Japan)
  Giant Okonomiyaki Pretz (sold in Japan)

Similar products
Similar snacks have been around in Germany, Austria and the US since at least the 1950s.
Popular products typically spur other companies to make similar items and Pretz is no exception. Current snacks that resemble Pretz include Pringles Stix, Pepero and Nagaraya Sweet-Mini Pretzels.

Commercial characters
 Aya Matsuura (2002–2006)
 Taichi Kokubun (2007–)
 Kavka Shishido (2013–)

See also
 List of Japanese snacks
 Pocky
 Pocky & Pretz Day

References

Japanese snack food
Japanese brand foods
Japanese brands